Dinka (natively ,  or simply ) is a Nilotic dialect cluster spoken by the Dinka people, the major ethnic group of South Sudan. There are several main varieties, Padang, Rek, Agaar, Bor, Hol, Twic East, Twic, which are distinct enough (though mutually intelligible) to require separate literary standards. Jaang, Jieng or Monyjieng is used as a general term to cover all Dinka languages. Recently Akutmɛ̈t Latueŋ Thuɔŋjäŋ (the Dinka Language Development Association) has proposed a unified written grammar of Dinka. 

The language most closely related to Dinka is the Nuer language. The Luo languages are also closely related. The Dinka vocabulary shows considerable proximity to Nubian, which is probably due to medieval interactions between the Dinka people and the kingdom of Alodia.

The Dinka are found mainly along the Nile, specifically the west bank of the White Nile, a major tributary flowing north from Uganda, north and south of the Sudd marsh in South Kordofan state of Sudan as well as Bahr el Ghazal region and Upper Nile state of South Sudan.

Linguistic features

Phonology

Consonants
There are 20 consonant phonemes:

Vowels
Dinka has a rich vowel system, with thirteen phonemically contrastive short vowels. There are seven vowel qualities plus a two-way distinction in phonation. The underdots, mark the breathy voice series, represented in Dinka orthography by diaereses, . Unmarked vowels are modal or creaky voiced.

Four phonetic phonations have been described in Dinka vowels: modal voice, breathy voice, faucalized voice, and harsh voice. The modal series has creaky or harsh voice realizations in certain environments, while the breathy vowels are centralized and have been described as being hollow voiced (faucalized). This is independent of tone.

On top of this, there are three phonemically contrastive vowel lengths, a feature found in very few languages.
Most Dinka verb roots are single, closed syllables with either a short or a long vowel. Some inflections lengthen that vowel:

  'isolate\2sg'
  'isolate\3sg'
  'provoke\2sg'
  'provoke\3sg'

Tone
The extensive use of tone and its interaction with morphology is a notable feature of all dialects of Dinka. The Bor dialects all have four tonemes at the syllable level: Low, High, Mid, and Fall.

In Bor proper, falling tone is not found on short vowels except as an inflection for the passive in the present tense. In Nyaarweng and Twïc it is not found at all. In Bor proper, and perhaps in other dialects as well, Fall is only realized as such at the end of a prosodic phrase. Elsewhere it becomes High.

In Bor proper and perhaps other dialects, a Low tone is phonetically low only after another low tone. Elsewhere it is falling, but not identical to Fall: It does not become High in the middle of a phrase, and speakers can distinguish the two falling tones despite the fact that they have the same range of pitch. The difference appears to be in the timing: with Fall one hears a high level tone that then falls, whereas the falling allophone of Low starts falling and then levels out. (That is, one falls on the first mora of the vowel, whereas the other falls on the second mora.) This is unusual because it has been theorized that such timing differences are never phonemic.

Morphology
This language exhibits vowel ablaut or apophony, the change of internal vowels (similar to English goose/geese):

Dialects
Linguists divide Dinka into five languages or dialect clusters corresponding to their geographic location with respect to each other:

Northeastern and western: 
 Padaŋ de Ayuël jiel (Abiliang, Nyiël, Ageer, Döŋjɔl).
 Luäc (Akook, Wieu, Aguer)
 Ŋɔŋ de Jok (Upper Nile)
 Rut
 Thoi

Western:
 Ŋɔŋ de Jok Athuorkok (Abiei)
 Ŋɔŋ de Jok de Awet
 Kuel de Ruweeng (Panaru, Aloor ku Paweny)

South Central:
 Aliap
 Ciëc (Jang)
 Gɔ̈k
 Agaar
 Apääk de Yirol west.

Southeastern:
 Bor
 Twic (Twi)
 Nyarweng
 Hol

Southwestern:
 Malual-Jiɛrnyaaŋ (Abiëm, Paliëët, Aroyo, Paliëupiny ku Pajok)

Luänyjäŋ
Twic Bol
Rek
 Aguɔɔk
 Apuk
 Awan Cän ku Awan Mɔ̈u
 Kuac Ayɔɔk
Abiëm Mayar
Abiɔŋ Ayɔɔm
Nöi Ayii
Nyaŋ Aköc
Atok Buk
Ler Akën
Awan Parek
Lɔn Ariik
Lɔn Paɣer
Kɔŋgör Arop
Apuk Padɔc
Muɔk Aköt Wut
Yär Ayiɛɛi
Apuk Jurwïïr
Thɔny Aduɔɔl
Luäny Malek
Aköök Deŋ
Thïïk/Thïŋ Majɔk
Kɔŋ-ŋör Akuëcbɛ̈ny
Pakɔɔr
Adöör Mabior
Bäc

These would be largely mutually intelligible if it were not for the importance of tone in grammatical inflection, as the grammatical function of tone differs from one variety to another.

See Ethnologue online map of Sudan for locations of dialects.

Writing system

Dinka has been written with several Latin alphabets since the early 20th century. The current alphabet is:
a ä b c d dh e ë ɛ ɛ̈ g ɣ i ï j k l m n nh ny ŋ t th u w o ö ɔ ɔ̈ p r y

Variants in other alphabets include:

An adaptation of the Nilerian script has been innovated by Aleu Majok Aleu

See also

 Dinka people
 Nilo-Saharan languages

References

Other resources

External links

Nilerian Dinka Alphabet
kasahorow page on Dinka
OpenRoad page on Dinka
Dinka Language Institute (Australia) (DLIA) multilingual site on Dinka, including in Dinka
PanAfrican L10n page on Dinka
Dinka alphabet on Answer.com
 Kitap De Duɔr Prayer Book with Hymns, in Dinka, Bor dialect (1956) digitized by Richard Mammana in 2015
 :din:Wikipedia:Apam këdït Wikipedia in Dinka

Western Nilotic languages
Languages of South Sudan
Languages of Sudan